"There Goes the Neighborhood" is a song by American singer-songwriter Sheryl Crow. The song was released as the second single from her third studio album, The Globe Sessions (1998), on November 23, 1998, and won an award for Best Female Rock Vocal Performance at the 43rd Annual Grammy Awards in 2001.

Commercially, the song peaked at number two on the US Billboard Triple A chart and became Crow's eighth top-five single in Canada, reaching number four on the RPM Top Singles ranking. In Europe, the song entered the top 40 in Iceland and the United Kingdom. Crow performed the song on her live album Sheryl Crow and Friends: Live from Central Park.

Grammy history
The song, along with the album The Globe Sessions, and the first single ("My Favorite Mistake") received nominations on the 1999 Grammy Awards. Crow won only Best Rock Album, and the single lost in the field Best Female Rock Vocal Performance (to "Uninvited" by Alanis Morissette). With the release of the album Sheryl Crow and Friends: Live from Central Park, Crow won the Best Female Rock Vocal Performance for second year in a row with the track, after taking the prize with her rendition of Guns N' Roses hit "Sweet Child o' Mine" at the 2000 Grammy Awards.

Track listings

UK CD1
 "There Goes the Neighborhood" (radio edit 1) – 4:06
 "You Always Get Your Way" – 2:41
 "Hard to Make a Stand" (live) – 3:56

UK CD2 and Australian CD single
 "There Goes the Neighborhood" (radio edit 1) – 4:06
 "Straight to the Moon" – 4:28
 "My Favorite Mistake" (live) – 4:01

UK cassette single
 "There Goes the Neighborhood" (radio edit)
 "Straight to the Moon"

French CD single
 "There Goes the Neighborhood" – 4:06
 "Run Baby Run" – 4:53

Credits and personnel
Credits are lifted from The Globe Sessions album booklet.

Studios
 Recorded at Globe Studios (New York City) and Sunset Sound Factory (Los Angeles)
 Mixed at Sunset Sound Factory (Los Angeles) and Soundtracks (New York City)
 Mastered at Gateway Mastering (Portland, Maine, US)

Personnel

 Sheryl Crow – writing, clavinet, percussion, production
 Jeff Trott – writing, guitars
 Val McCallum – guitar
 Tim Smith – bass
 Gregg Williams – drums, percussion
 Dan McCarroll – drums
 Bobby Keys – baritone, tenor, and alto saxophone and solo
 Michael Davis – trombone
 Kent Smith – trumpet
 Trina Shoemaker – recording
 Huksy Hoskolds – additional recording
 Andy Wallace – mixing
 Bob Ludwig – mastering

Charts

Weekly charts

Year-end charts

References

1998 songs
1999 singles
A&M Records singles
Grammy Award for Best Female Rock Vocal Performance
Music videos directed by Matthew Rolston
Sheryl Crow songs
Songs written by Jeff Trott
Songs written by Sheryl Crow